The purported flag of Blackbeard, consisting of a horned skeleton using a spear to pierce a bleeding heart, is typically attributed to the pirate Edward Teach, better known as Blackbeard. However, contrary to popular belief, there is no accurate description of any specific flag used by Blackbeard during his piracy beyond using black flags or "bloody flags" and, in any case, the "flag of Blackbeard" appears to be an early 20th-century design.

History 
During the Golden Age of Piracy, Blackbeard (c. 1680 – 1718) was one of the most infamous pirates on the seas. The only record there is of what flag he flew was in 1718 in a newspaper report which stated that Blackbeard's fleet, including his flagship Queen Anne's Revenge, during an attack on the Protestant Caesar flew black flags with death heads and "bloody flags". However it did not state which ship Blackbeard was on at the time.

Following a revival in interest in piracy in the 20th century, the flag with the horned skeleton and bleeding heart first appeared in an article in The Mariner's Mirror magazine as a general pirate's flag in 1912, but the article made no assertion of it being Blackbeard's flag. Later in the century approximately around the 1970s it started to be described as Blackbeard's flag and was often used as such in books and television programmes portraying him. Some academic institutions such as the Smithsonian have also incorrectly described it as the flag of Blackbeard.

Design 

The design of the flag consisted of a horned skeleton raising an hourglass "toasting the Devil" in its right hand. In the skeleton's left hand, it held a spear pointing towards a red heart which had three drops of red blood below it, supposedly to signal that no quarter would be given. The historian E. T. Fox affirmed that this flag design would not have been of 18th-century pirate origin because, if the skeleton was meant to represent the Devil, then it would not have been a skeleton, and if it was supposed to represent Death, then it would not have been horned. Most pirate flags at the time would have used simple imagery based on Christian symbols of mortality. Flags of a similar design had been used by Edward Low, Francis Spriggs and Charles Harris.

See also 
 Jolly Roger

References

Literature 
 Fox, E.T. (2015). Jolly Rogers, the True History of Pirate Flags. 

Piracy
Maritime flags
Historical flags